Toshin may refer to

Toshin Golf Tournament, Japan
Tōshin (塔身), a component of a Hōkyōintō (Japanese pagoda)
Ogre (Tekken), a video game character, also called Toshin in Japanese